During World War II, the United States Army Air Forces (USAAF) established numerous airfields in New Mexico for training pilots and aircrews of USAAF fighters and bombers.

Most of these airfields were under the command of Fourth Air Force or the Army Air Forces Training Command (AAFTC) (A predecessor of the current-day United States Air Force Air Education and Training Command).  However the other USAAF support commands (Air Technical Service Command (ATSC); Air Transport Command (ATC) or Troop Carrier Command) commanded a significant number of airfields in a support roles.

It is still possible to find remnants of these wartime airfields. Many were converted into municipal airports, some were returned to agriculture and several were retained as United States Air Force installations and were front-line bases during the Cold War. Hundreds of the temporary buildings that were used survive today, and are being used for other purposes.

Major Airfields
Second Air Force
 Alamogordo AAF, Alamogordo
 Now:  Holloman Air Force Base
 Clovis AAF, Clovis
 Now:  Cannon Air Force Base
 Kirtland Field, Albuquerque
 Now:  Kirtland Air Force Base

Air Technical Service Command
 Albuquerque AAF, Albuquerque (merged into Kirtland Field in 1944)

Army Air Forces Training Command
 Carlsbad AAF, Carlsbad
 Now: Cavern City Air Terminal 
 Deming AAF, Deming (reassigned to Second Air Force in 1944)
 Now: Deming Municipal Airport 
 Fort Sumner AAF, Fort Sumner
 Now: Fort Sumner Municipal Airport 
 Hobbs AAF, Hobbs
 Was: Hobbs Army Airfield (1942-1948)
 Now: Hobbs Industrial Air Park

 Roswell AAF, Roswell
 Was: Walker Air Force Base (1947-1967)
 Now: Roswell International Air Center (RIAC)

References

 
 Thole, Lou (1999), Forgotten Fields of America : World War II Bases and Training, Then and Now - Vol. 2.  Pictorial Histories Pub . 
 Military Airfields in World War II - New Mexico

External links

 "Keep 'Em Flying: The Story of the Hobbs Army Air Field"
 "Abandoned & Little-Known Airfields: New Mexico"

 01
World War II
World War II
World War II
World War II
United States World War II army airfields